The sport of football in the country of Suriname is run by the Surinamese Football Association. The association administers the national football team, as well as the national football league.

National team

The 1978 FIFA World Cup was the nearest the national team got to qualifying a major world tournament. The national team has lost potential players to the Netherlands.

References